Shalva Loladze (April 16, 1916 – April 25, 1945) was a former Soviet Georgian POW and an officer in the German Wehrmacht who headed a revolt of the Georgian soldiers against the German commandership on the Dutch island of Texel.

Loladze served in the Soviet military at the outbreak of World War II. In 1942, he was a Soviet Air Force captain and an air squadron commander. His airplane was shot down over Ukraine and Loladze was captured by the Germans. He then joined the Georgische Legion of the Wehrmacht and served in the 882nd Infantry Battalion Königin Tamara with the rank of Leutnant (second lieutenant). The battalion was deployed on the German-occupied Dutch island of Texel in the closing months of World War II. The night of April 5/6, 1945, Loladze led an insurrection of the battalion's Georgian personnel. Loladze was killed in fighting on April 25, 1945. He is buried together with his comrades-in-arms at the Georgian War Cemetery of Texel which has been given Loladze's name.

References

1916 births
1945 deaths

People of World War II from Georgia (country)
Aviators from Georgia (country)
Collaborators with Nazi Germany from Georgia (country)
German Army personnel killed in World War II
Shot-down aviators
Soviet Air Force officers
Soviet prisoners of war
Soviet military personnel killed in World War II
Mutineers